The Second Annual Balkan Music Awards were held in Sofia, the capital city of Bulgaria for the second time. The previous year's main winner of the show with the title "Best Song of Balkans 2009" was Željko Joksimović with Ljubavi representing Serbia with 37 points, followed closely by Flori Mumajesi with Playback from Albania with 31 points. Balkan Music Awards was originally broadcast by the Bulgarian Balkanika Music Television, and also by 11 other television stations in the Balkans.

Performers
  Inna

Participants for "Best Song for Balkans 2010"
The following list shows 11 participants from every country who will wave their flag in Sofia. The participants were chosen online for 2 week voting. In every country there were 5 songs, most played in BMTV where only one got the chance to represent its country in Balkan's biggest annual award show. Every participant will be singing in front of an outside audience.

See also
 Balkan Music Awards

References

Flori Mumajesi

Balkan Music Awards
2011 music awards
2011 in Bulgaria
2010s in Sofia